These are the Barbados national football team fixtures and results.

Results

2008–present

References

See also
Barbados national football team results (2020–present)

results